Mangal is an Asian given name and surname.

Mangal may also refer to:

 Mangal State, a former Hindu princely state in Himachal Pradesh, northern India 
 Mangal (Pashtun tribe), a tribe originating in the Afghan provinces Paktia and Khost 
 Mangal (barbecue), Turkish-style barbecue and its typical cooking equipment
 Mangal (typeface), a font for the Devanagari script, used for some Indian languages
 Magal (song), or mangal, a folk song tradition of Nepal
 A Mangrove swamp, a wet environment dominated by that saline woody tree and shrub

See also 
Arts
 Mangal-Kāvya, a collection of Bengali religious poetry
 Annada Mangal or Nutan Mangal, a Bengali narrative poem
 Mangal Pandey: The Rising, an Indian biographic film about Mangal Pandey
Place
 Lazha Mangal District, a district in Paktia Province, Afghanistan
Other
 Mangal Dosha, an astrological combination